The 1901 Monmouth Boroughs by-election was a by-election held on 7 May 1901 for the British House of Commons constituency of Monmouth Boroughs.

The by-election was triggered by the unseating of the Conservative Party Member of Parliament (MP) Frederick Rutherfoord Harris, as a result of an election petition alleging irregularities in election spending.
The Liberal candidate was Albert Spicer, who had previously been the sitting MP but had lost in the previous general election. The result was a victory for the Conservative candidate Sheriff Joseph Lawrence, who held the seat, although the party's majority was halved.

Result

Aftermath
Despite the intervention of a Labour Representation Committee candidate, the Liberal Party gained the seat;

See also
 Lists of United Kingdom by-elections
 Monmouth Boroughs constituency

References

Further reading
 The Times, 8 May 1901

By-elections to the Parliament of the United Kingdom in Welsh constituencies
Monmouth Boroughs by-election
Monmouth Boroughs by-election
Monmouth Boroughs by-election
1900s elections in Wales
Elections in Monmouthshire
20th century in Monmouthshire
Monmouth Boroughs by-election